Matsuo Dam  is a gravity dam located in Miyazaki Prefecture in Japan. The dam is used for flood control and power production. The catchment area of the dam is 304.1 km2. The dam impounds about 195  ha of land when full and can store 45202 thousand cubic meters of water. The construction of the dam was started on 1939 and completed in 1951.

See also
List of dams in Japan

References

Dams in Miyazaki Prefecture